Izbașa is a Romanian surname. It derives from the Turkish word yüzbaș which means "head over 100, centurion". It may refer to:

Sandra Izbașa (born 1990), Romanian artistic gymnast
Stana Izbașa (born 1947), Romanian folk singer

See also
 Izbășești (disambiguation)

Romanian-language surnames